Sultan Ibrahim ibni Almarhum Sultan Iskandar (born 22 November 1958) is the 25th Sultan of Johor and the 5th Sultan of Modern Johor since January 2010. He is the son of Sultan Iskandar.
A motorcycle enthusiast, Sultan Ibrahim is the founder of the annual motorcycling tour event, Kembara Mahkota Johor.

Biography

Early life

Tunku Ibrahim Ismail was born on 22 November 1958 in Sultan Aminah Hospital, Johor Bahru, Johor, Malaya during the reign of his great grandfather, Sultan Ibrahim. He was the eldest son of Sultan Iskandar by his first wife Josephine Ruby Trevorrow (2 December 1935 – 1 June 2018), an English lady from Torquay, whom Sultan Iskandar (then Tunku Mahmood) met while he was studying in England. Trevorrow, a proprietor by profession, took on the name of "Kalsom binti Abdullah" for a time following her marriage to Tunku Iskandar. His mother has since remarried and lived in England.

His great-grandfather, Sultan Ibrahim died in London on 8 May 1959, thus, Tunku Ibrahim Ismail's grandfather, Ismail of Johor succeeded him as Sultan of Johor. Ibrahim Ismail moved up to second in line to the throne, after his father.

The late Sultan Iskandar sent him to complete his secondary education at Trinity Grammar School in Sydney, Australia from 1968 until 1970. After finishing his high school, he was sent to Pusat Latihan Tentera Darat (PULADA) in Kota Tinggi for basic military training. He also received military training in the US–at Fort Benning, Georgia and later at Fort Bragg, North Carolina.

Tunku Ibrahim was appointed as the Tunku Mahkota of Johor on 3 July 1981, and had been primarily residing at Istana Pasir Pelangi since then. Tunku Ibrahim was the regent of Johor between 26 April 1984 and 25 April 1989 when his father served his term as the Yang di-Pertuan Agong of Malaysia. In recent years, Tunku Ibrahim gradually took over some of the state duties and functions from his aging father; these included the 211th Conference of Rulers, whereby Tunku Ibrahim and Tengku Abdullah, the Tengku Mahkota of Pahang represented their fathers in the meetings, among some other state functions.

Shortly before Filipino politician Benigno Aquino's assassination in August 1983, Tunku Ibrahim met Aquino upon his arrival in Singapore and later brought him to meet other Malaysian leaders across the Causeway. Once in Johor, Aquino met Ibrahim's father, Sultan Iskandar, who was a close friend of Aquino's.

Sultan of Johor

A few hours before his father's death on 22 January 2010, Tunku Ibrahim was appointed as the Regent of Johor, following medical reports that suggested of Sultan Iskandar's impending demise. Sultan Iskandar died on the same night, and Tunku Ibrahim was installed as the Sultan of Johor the following morning. The Menteri Besar (Chief Minister) of Johor, Abdul Ghani Othman cited that Sultan Ibrahim and immediate members of the royal family will undertake a mourning period of 40 days. During the mourning season, Sultan Ibrahim made his inaugural presence at the Conference of Rulers in February 2010 as the Sultan of Johor.

On 30 June 2011, Sultan Ibrahim drove the last train from Tanjong Pagar railway station, having received tuition from Chief Locomotive Inspector Hasnol Azahari Aman of Keretapi Tanah Melayu to enable him to do this. He stated that he wished to do this as his grandfather, Ismail of Johor had opened the causeway between Singapore and Malaya in 1923, and that it was appropriate that he should drive the last train out of the station.

He also declared Muar as Johor's new royal capital, replacing Johor Bahru on 5 February 2012. This coincided with the Maulidur Rasul celebrations.

Sultan Ibrahim became the first Johor Ruler to celebrate his birthday celebration in Muar on 22 November 2012. He picks the town because it is "rich in history and tradition besides being peaceful, beautiful and progressive". He wanted the state government to gazette all the old buildings in the town as a state heritage. He also wants the local authorities to preserve the cleanliness of Sungai Muar which could be done by relocating the bus and taxi terminals elsewhere.

He was crowned as the Sultan of Johor on 23 March 2015. The last coronation was that of his grandfather Sultan Ismail on 10 February 1960. From 2015 onwards, 23 March is made an annual state public holiday as the Sultan's official birthday, replacing the public holiday on 22 November, the Sultan's actual birthday.

He is noted for his religious moderation and has condemned the creeping Arabisation of Malaysian Muslim culture. Despite being the only Sultan in Malaysia without tertiary (postsecondary) education, he has promoted quality education for Johor.

Marriage and issue
Sultan Ibrahim married Her Majesty Raja Zarith Sofia, daughter of Sultan Idris Shah II of Perak, in 1982. They have six children:

Tunku Ismail Idris Abdul Majid Abu Bakar (born 30 June 1984). He was appointed the Deputy Crown Prince in April 2006 by Sultan Iskandar, and became the Crown Prince upon Sultan Ibrahim's accession.
Tunku Tun Aminah Maimunah Iskandariah (born 8 April 1986) She was awarded the title Tun by Sultan Ibrahim in 2012. She married Dato' Dennis Muhammad Abdullah né Dennis Verbaas, a former semi-professional footballer from the Netherlands, on 14 August 2017.
Tunku Idris Iskandar (born 25 December 1987) the Tunku Temenggong of Johor. He was appointed as the Regent of Johor during the absence of his father and the Tunku Mahkota on 29 September 2012.
Almarhum (Late) Tunku Abdul Jalil (born 5 Jul 1990, died 5 Dec 2015) the Tunku Laksamana of Johor 
Tunku Abdul Rahman (born 5 February 1993) the Tunku Panglima of Johor 
Tunku Abu Bakar (born 30 May 2001) the Tunku Putera of Johor

Decrees
Sultan Ibrahim has issued a few decrees to the state to date.

Public weekend from Saturday/Sunday to Friday/Saturday
Johor, as with the former standalone British protectorates of Perlis, Kedah, Kelantan and Terengganu, used to rest on Fridays and Saturdays, in contrast with the former Federated Malay States as well as Malacca, Penang, Sabah and Sarawak and the Federal Territory which observe their weekends on Saturdays and Sundays. Johor, together with Perlis, moved their weekend to Saturday and Sunday on 1 January 1994 to synchronise with Singapore next door as well as with Kuala Lumpur, as Johor by then was a quickly industrialising state.

However, on 22 November 2013, on Sultan Ibrahim's birthday celebrations, he decreed that Johor will move back its weekend to Friday and Saturday, to enable Muslims in the state to attend their Friday prayers, effective 1 January 2014. This move was not without certain controversy, as this has caused disruptions, particularly for private businesses dealing with Singapore. The private sector nevertheless continues to rest on Saturdays and Sundays.

District name changes
In August 2015, Sultan Ibrahim decreed that the name of Kulaijaya district be reverted to its former name of Kulai. He also decreed that Nusajaya be renamed to Iskandar Puteri, as well as renaming Ledang District to Tangkak District.

Ban on vape
Sultan Ibrahim issued a decree banning vape in Johor effective 1 January 2016. The purposes of the ban is for the sake of the health of the Johor state residents. Kelantan and Terengganu followed soon after.

Ban on oversized signboards
In January 2016, Sultan Ibrahim also decreed that signboards for businesses must not exceed 6.1 m × 1.2 m, so as to prevent any dangers to the public as well as to reduce unsightly signboards which mar the city beauty.

Controversies

Allegations of criminal misconduct
Occasional reports of alleged criminal misconduct from the 1980s onwards marred Tunku Ibrahim's reputation somewhat, albeit to a much lesser extent than his father, Sultan Iskandar, whose past heinous crimes had received considerable attention from mainstream media. In the 1980s, he was convicted of shooting dead a man in a nightclub during a feud, but was quickly pardoned.

In late 1992 to early 1993, Tunku Ibrahim also experienced fallouts of the Gomez Incident–in which his father and younger brother, Tunku Majid were accused of two separate but related incidences of assault which provoked a moral outrage nationwide and ultimately resulting in constitutional amendments allowing members of the royalty to be prosecuted for criminal wrongdoings. During that period of time, the press, which was supported by the Malaysian government, launched a series of vociferous press reports on the history of alleged incidences of royal wrongdoings, of which parliamentarians highlighted that Tunku Ibrahim had been convicted in at least two cases of assault in the 1980s. This included a victim who was allegedly assaulted by Tunku Ibrahim, Rahim Mohd Nor, who went so far as to describe his assault experience as an act of sadism by Tunku Ibrahim.

In March 2005, a member of the Malaysian royalty allegedly assaulted a young woman by the name of Yasmin with whom he accused of two-timing him with another policeman. The victim's father, Mohd Yasin, later lodged a police report which alleged that the assault culprit was Tunku Ibrahim, the then Tunku Mahkota of Johor.

Other incidents
In October 2005, a brawl occurred on Pulau Rawa after a Johor prince allegedly gatecrashed a wedding party. The prince ordered some guests off the island after a fight broke out when a woman refused to dance with one of the gatecrashers. The locals, who felt offended by the woman's attitude, went off but soon returned with golf clubs and weapons and started a fight. In the process, several people were injured and sent to hospital, while five others were arrested, including a 20-year-old prince from the Johor royal family. The names of the culprits were not released by the police, who chose to retain the confidentiality of the attackers. The Tunku Mahkota issued a press statement to urge the culprits to apologise to the affected guests.

The following June, press reports leaked that Tunku Ibrahim had chalked RM26,700 worth of unpaid traffic fines since 2000, causing much embarrassment to the crown prince. A later report quoted him settling all the past fines with the traffic police.

Tunku Ibrahim also spent lavishly on an unusual car plate number. For example, in May 2012, he spent RM520,000 to successfully bid for the car number plate WWW 1 for his red orange Satria Neo. In January 2014, he spent a record breaking RM748,000 on the car plate number W1N for his blue Suprima S. In July 2016, he also spent a record breaking RM836,660 on the car plate number F1 for his ruby red Proton Perdana.

Business dealings 
Although given a monthly allowance of RM27,000, Sultan Ibrahim had done some business dealings such as
 Investment in Redtone (20% equity)
 Investment in MOL AccessPortal (15% equity)
 Investment in RedTone International (20% equity)
 Investment in 7Eleven Malaysia (8.5% equity)
 Investment in Berjaya Assets
 Investment in Umobile (15% equity)
 Investment in Berjaya Time Square (20% equity)
 Sold 116 acres of prime seafront land in Johor Bahru (previously converted from State land to Sultanate land, formerly the southbound heavy vehicle and passenger vehicle separate border crossings from Malaysia to Singapore, before the Johor–Singapore Causeway) and coastal reclamation rights, to Guangzhou R&F for MYR 4.5 billion 
 Benalec Holdings reclamation sites in Pengarang 
 Tanjung Piai for petroleum facilities and a maritime industrial park 
 Country Garden's reclamation of 4 islands off Tanjung Kupang for the Forest City megaproject (expected size of 3,425 acres, adjacent to the Malaysia–Singapore Second Link), of which Sultan Ibrahim has 64.4% equity in Esplanade Danga 88 Sdn Bhd, which in turn has 34% equity in the joint-venture company Country Garden Pacific View (CGPV) Sdn Bhd.

Issue

Honours

Johor honours 
  Grand Master and First Class (DK I) of the Royal Family Order of Johor 
  Grand Master and First Class of the Order of the Crown of Johor (SPMJ, 28 October 1980)
   Grand Master and Knight Grand Commander of the Order of the Loyalty of Sultan Ismail (SSIJ, 8 April 1990)
  Founding Grand Master and Grand Knight (SMIJ) of the Order of Sultan Ibrahim of Johor (since 30 March 2015)
  Sultan Ismail Coronation Medal (PSI 1st class) 10 February 1960
  Sultan Mahmud Iskandar Coronation Medal 11 May 1981

Honours of Malaysia 
  : 
  Knight Grand Commander of the Order of the Defender of the Realm (SMN) - Tun (1987)
  Recipient of the Order of the Crown of the Realm (DMN) (2 March 2015)
  :
  Recipient of the Royal Family Order or Star of Yunus (DK)
  Knight Grand Commander of the Order of the Crown of Kelantan (SPMK) – Dato’ (1994)
  : 
  Member of the Royal Family Order of Negeri Sembilan (DKNS) (14 February 2011)
  :
  Member 2nd class of the Family Order of the Crown of Indra of Pahang (DK II) (24 October 1997)
  Member 1st class of the Family Order of the Crown of Indra of Pahang (DK I) (24 October 2011)
  :
  Recipient of the Royal Family Order of Perak (DK) (19 April 2010)
  : 
  Recipient of the Perlis Family Order of the Gallant Prince Syed Putra Jamalullail (DK) (16 May 2010)
  Knight Grand Commander of Order of the Crown of Perlis (SPMP) - Dato’ Seri
  : 
  First Class of the Royal Family Order of Selangor (DK I) (2011)
  : 
  Member first class of the Family Order of Terengganu (DK I) (27 April 2013)
  :
  Royal Family Order of Kedah (DK) (25 February 2018)
  : 
  Grand Commander of the Order of Kinabalu (SPDK) - Datuk Seri Panglima
  :
  Knight Grand Commander of the Order of the Star of Hornbill Sarawak (DP) – Datuk Patinggi (2009)

Foreign honours 
  : 
  Order of Sheikh Isa ibn Salman Al Khalifa (Wisam al-Shaikh ‘Isa bin Salman Al Khalifa), First Class (2017)

  : 
  Recipient of the Royal Family Order of the Crown of Brunei (DKMB) - (2014)
  Sultan of Brunei Golden Jubilee Medal - (2017)

  :
  Grand Cross (GCrS) (Datu) of the Order of Sikatuna (2019)

Honorary doctorate 
  : 
 Honorary Degree of Doctor of Laws  from the National University of Singapore (NUS) - (20 July 2022)

Ancestry

Notes

References

 Ali, Abdullah, Malaysian Protocol and Correct Forms of Address, published by Times Books International, 1986, 
 Cheong, Mei Sui, Information Malaysia: 1985 Year Book,published by Berita Publishing, 1985
 De Ledesma, Charles; Lewis, Mark; Savage, Pauline, Malaysia, Singapore and Brunei, published by Rough Guides, 2003, 
 Karim, Gulrose; Tate, Desmond Muzaffar, Information Malaysia, published by Berita Publ. Sdn. Bhd., 1989
 Kershaw, Roger, Monarchy in South-East Asia: The Faces of Tradition in Transition, published by Routledge, 2001, 
 
 Morris, Ira J., My East was Gorgeous, by Ira J. Morris, published by Travel Book Club, 1958
 Nadarajah, K. N, Tengku Ahmad Rithauddeen: His Story, Pelanduk Publications, 2000, 
 Nadarajah, Nesalamar, Johore and the Origins of British Control, 1895-1914, published by Arenabuku, 2000, 
 Rahman, Abdul; Solomon, J. S., Challenging Times, published by Pelanduk Publications, 1985, 
 The International Who's Who 2004: Book with Single-User Online Access, by Elizabeth Sleeman, published by Europa Publications, Published by Routledge, 2003, 
 Towards Relevant Education: A General Sourcebook for Teachers, published by Education Forum (Philippines), Alternative Instructional Materials Project, Education Forum, 1986,

External links

Official profile
Official website of his coronation on 23 March 2015

1958 births
Living people
Ibrahim Ismail
Ibrahim Ismail
Ibrahim Ismail
Malaysian Muslims
Malaysian people of Malay descent
Malaysian people of Chinese descent
Malaysian people of Danish descent
Malaysian people of English descent
People convicted of assault
Malaysian people convicted of manslaughter
Recipients of Malaysian royal pardons

Ibrahim Ismail
Ibrahim Ismail
Knights Grand Commander of the Order of the Loyalty of Sultan Ismail

Knights Grand Commander of the Order of the Star of Hornbill Sarawak
Grand Commanders of the Order of the Defender of the Realm
First Classes of Royal Family Order of Selangor
Grand Commanders of the Order of Kinabalu
       
First Classes of the Family Order of Terengganu
21st-century Malaysian politicians
Recipients of the Order of the Crown of the Realm